Äxmät İsxaq (1905–1991) was a Soviet-Tatar poet, translator, and journalist.

Biography 
Äxmät İsxaq was born  in Kazan. He received his professional education at the Möxämmädiä madrasa and the Tatar Pedagogical Institute in Kazan, before starting work in the editorial office of the Tatar Regional Committee of Komsomol.

In 1928, he returned to Kazan and began working for other Tatar-language publications, including the newspaper Qızıl Tatarstan (Кызыл Татарстан; Red Tatarstan) and the satirical magazine  (Чаян; Scorpion).

In 1939, he became head of the Tatar ASSR branch of the Union of Soviet Writers, a position he held until 1942. In 1942, during World War II, İsxaq enlisted in the Soviet Army and served as a platoon commander and a military journalist first in the Russian Far East and then in Ukraine. After the war, he worked for the newspaper  (Ватан чакыра; The Motherland Calls) before becoming chief editor of Çayan in 1963 a position he held through 1969. At Çayan, he wrote under the pen name  (Карәхмәтне).

Works 
During his lifetime, İsxaq published some 40 books in Tatar, Russian, and Bashkir, including poetry, satirical works, fairy tales, opera librettos, reviews and critiques, and other works. He is also known for his translations of Russian classical poets and Tatar and Turkic poetry.

His first literary work, a poem called "" (Кызыл кошлар; Red Birds), was published in 1923 in the journal  (Кызыл Шәрекъ яшьләре; The Youth of the Red East).

İsxaq translated the works of Ali-Shir Nava'i, Abai Qunanbaiuly, Mahtumkuli, Alexander Pushkin, Mikhail Lermontov, and Vladimir Mayakovsky into Tatar, along with translations of the Old Tatar poet Qol Ğäli into modern Tatar. He also contributed to Tatar musical culture, including writing the libretto for an opera based on 's 1948 novel  (Намусы; Honor) and translating other librettos, songs, and musical passages into Tatar, including a translation of the State Anthem of the Soviet Union.

Family 
Äxmät İsxaq was married to Zäynäp Ğosmanova, whose sister was married to Tatarstan politician . The couple had two sons, İrşat and İlik.

Selected works 
  (1929) (Song of the Streets of Stone)
  (1939) (Song of Happiness)
  (1946) (Quray)
 (1956) (Poet–Hero Musa Cälil) 
  (1957) (Meeting in Song)
  (1963) (Tuqay's Poetic Skills)
  (1983) (Thoughts, Smiles)

References

External links 

1905 births
1991 deaths
20th-century Russian poets
Translators from the Russian Empire
Writers from Kazan
Communist Party of the Soviet Union members
Recipients of the Order of Friendship of Peoples
Recipients of the Order of the Red Banner of Labour
Translators from Russian
Russian male journalists
Russian male poets
Russian war correspondents
Soviet journalists
Soviet male poets
Soviet war correspondents
Tatar journalists
Tatar poets